The Girl in the Glass Cage is a 1929 American part-talkie crime drama film directed by Ralph Dawson and starring Loretta Young, Carroll Nye, Matthew Betz, Lucien Littlefield, and Ralph Lewis. It is based on the 1927 novel of the same name by George Kibbe Turner. The film was released by Warner Bros. on June 23, 1929.

Cast
Loretta Young as Gladys Cosgrove
Carroll Nye as Terry Pomfret
Matthew Betz as 'Doc' Striker
Lucien Littlefield as Sheik Smith
Ralph Lewis as John Cosgrove
George E. Stone as Carlos
Julia Swayne Gordon as Mrs. Pomfret
Majel Coleman as Isabelle Van Court
Charles Sellon as Dan Jackson - Prosecutor
Robert T. Haines as Pomfret

Preservation
The film is now considered lost.

References

External links

1929 crime drama films
American crime drama films
1929 films
Transitional sound films
American black-and-white films
Lost American films
Warner Bros. films
Films based on American novels
1929 lost films
1920s American films
1920s English-language films